Dantonio is an American surname of Italian origin. Notable people with the surname include:

Fats Dantonio (1918–1993), Major League Baseball catcher for the Brooklyn Dodgers
Mark Dantonio (born 1956), American football coach

See also

D'Antonio, Italian surname
di Antonio, Italian surname
Emile de Antonio

Patronymic surnames